This list covers television programs whose first character of the title (excluding "the") is a number. It does not include television programs whose titles contain a number elsewhere in the title.

Numbers

0

1

The 1/2 Hour News Hour (2007)
The 100 (2014)
100 Deeds for Eddie McDowd (1999–2002)
100 Questions (2010–2014)
100 Things to Do Before High School (2014–2016)
100 Winners (2007)
101 Dalmatian Street (2019–2020)
101 Dalmatians: The Series (1997–1998)
101 Ways to Leave a Gameshow (2010)
10-8: Officers on Duty (2003–2004)
1000 Ways to Die (2008–2012)
10 Things I Hate About You (2009–2010)
11.22.63 (2016)
12 Deadly Days (2016)
12 O'Clock High12 oz. Mouse (2005–2006)
12 Monkeys (2015-2018)The 13 Ghosts of Scooby-Doo (1985)13 Reasons Why (2017–)15/Love (2004–2006)1600 Penn (2012–2013)16 and Pregnant (2009–)16 Hudson (2018–)18 to Life (2010–2011)19 Kids and Counting (2008–2015)$1.98 Beauty Show (1978–1980)1st Look (2008–)1 vs. 100 (2006–2011)

220/20 (1962–1967) (Canada)20/20 (1993–2014) (New Zealand)20/20 (1978–) (US)20th Century with Mike Wallace21 Jump Street (1987–1991)227 (1985–1990)24 (2001–2014)24: Legacy (2017)$24 in 24 (2012–present)240-Robert (1979–1981)25 Words or Less (2018–present)The $25,000 Pyramid (1973–2012)26 Men (1957–1959)2 Broke Girls (2011–2017)2 Stupid Dogs (1993–1995)2DTV (2001–2004)

33% (2016–present) 3AM (2015)3Below (2018–2019)3-2-1 Contact (1980–1992)3-2-1 Penguins! (2007–2008)30 for 30 (2009–present)30 Minute Meals (2001–present)30 Rock (2006–2013)30 Seconds to Fame (2002–2003)31 Minutes (2003–2014)36 (2011–present)3 lbs (2006–)3rd Rock from the Sun (1996–2001)3rd and Bird (2008-2010)3-South (2002–2003)
4$40 a DayThe 4400 (2004–2007)44 Cats (2018–2021)48 Hours (1988–)4 Square (2003–2007)4th and Loud (2014)

550/50 (1997–2005)50 Cent: The Money and the Power (2008–2009)500 Questions (2015–2016)

66 Little McGhees (2012–2014)60 Days In (2016–)60 Minutes (1968–)60 Minutes Sports (2013–)64 Zoo Lane (1999–2013)The $64,000 Question  (1955–58, 1990–93)666 Park Avenue (2012–2013)6teen (2004–2010)

7The 700 Club (1966–)704 Hauser (1994)77 Sunset Strip (1958–1964)The 7D (2014–2016)7th Heaven (1996–2007)

88:15 from Manchester (1990–1992)800 Words (2015–present)8 Man (1963–1964)8 Simple Rules (2002–2005)8th & Ocean (2006)
99JKL9-1-19-1-1: Lone Star90's House90210 (2008–2013)9 to 5 (1982–1988)90 Bristol Court (1964–1965)90 Day Fiancé (2014–present)90 Days, Time to Love'' (2006–2007) (South Korea)

Next:  List of television programs: A